Hannibal Mejbri (born 21 January 2003) is a professional footballer who plays as a midfielder for  club Birmingham City, on loan from  club Manchester United, and the Tunisia national team.

Mejbri joined the Manchester United youth system in 2019 from AS Monaco. He had previously spent time at the Clairefontaine academy. He made his senior debut for the club in a Premier League game in May 2021.

Born in France to Tunisian parents, Mejbri represented his birth country at under-16 and under-17 levels. He made his senior international debut for Tunisia in 2021.

Early life
Mejbri was born in Ivry-sur-Seine (suburban Paris), France, and joined Paris FC in 2009. In 2016, it was reported that he was being scouted by several English clubs, including Manchester United, Manchester City, Liverpool and Arsenal, and spent time on trial with the latter. He also spent time studying at the prestigious INF Clairefontaine academy. His elder brother, Abderrahmen Mejbri, is the current sporting coach working in Vietnam national football team and Pho Hien FC, a Vietnamese youth development club that Hannibal once visited and trained with.

Club career

Early career
Despite interest from English clubs, Mejbri had a short spell with Athletic Club de Boulogne-Billancourt, before joining AS Monaco in 2018 for a fee of €1 million. Although initially impressed by Monaco's youth development, Mejbri became disillusioned by the Monégasque club within a year of signing, with his parents claiming that the Ligue 1 side had breached contract agreements. 

In 2019, he was being tracked by clubs across Europe, including the German, French and Spanish champions, Bayern Munich, Paris Saint-Germain and Barcelona respectively. Mejbri said that he was experiencing the "dark side of football" prior to signing with Manchester United and that he had not played football for nearly four months. Before signing, he was back home in Quartier des Amandiers and was training on his own with his sibling.

Manchester United
On 11 August 2019, Premier League side Manchester United announced on their website that they had reached an agreement with Monaco to sign Mejbri, with the youngster reportedly rejecting moves to other English clubs. The fee paid by the Manchester club was believed to be around €5 million, possibly rising to €10 million in add-ons.

Mejbri settled quickly into Manchester United's youth teams, progressing to the under-23 squad despite still being 17. Mejbri made his debut playing for the Manchester United U21 side against Salford City in the 2020–21 EFL Trophy on 9 September 2020. He signed a new contract with United in March 2021. On 20 May 2021, he won the Denzil Haroun Reserve Player of the Year award. made his senior debut three days later in a 2–1 win over Wolverhampton Wanderers in the final game of the Premier League season; he came on to replace Juan Mata in the 82nd minute.

Loan to Birmingham City
On 29 August 2022, Mejbri joined Championship club Birmingham City on loan for the 2022–23 season.  On 10 February 2023, he scored his first senior goal, against West Bromwich Albion, with a surprise free-kick.

International career

France
Mejbri made 12 appearances for France at under-16 level and three appearances at under-17 level.

Tunisia
Eligible to represent Tunisia through his parents, with his father, Lotfi, reportedly having played in Tunisia, Mejbri was called up to the Tunisia national team for the first time in May 2021, committing his international future to the nation of his parents' birth. He debuted in a 1–0 friendly win over DR Congo on 5 June 2021.

Hannibal made his 2021 FIFA Arab Cup debut, where he started in all five of Tunisia's games as they progressed to the final. Hannibal put in two man-of-the-match performances against United Arab Emirates and Egypt in the group stage and semi-finals respectively. Hannibal started in the final against Algeria on 18 December 2021, eventually losing 2–0 to Algeria to end as runners-up.

Career statistics

Club

International

Honours
Tunisia
FIFA Arab Cup runner-up: 2021
Kirin Cup Soccer: 2022

Individual
Denzil Haroun Reserve Player of the Year: 2020–21
African Revelation of the Year (Africa d'Or): 2021, 2022

References

External links

 
 

2003 births
Living people
People from Ivry-sur-Seine
Footballers from Val-de-Marne
Tunisian footballers
Tunisia international footballers
French footballers
France youth international footballers
French sportspeople of Tunisian descent
Association football midfielders
Paris FC players
INF Clairefontaine players
AC Boulogne-Billancourt players
AS Monaco FC players
Manchester United F.C. players
Birmingham City F.C. players
Premier League players
English Football League players
Tunisian expatriate footballers
Tunisian expatriate sportspeople in England
French expatriate footballers
French expatriate sportspeople in England
Expatriate footballers in England
2021 Africa Cup of Nations players
2022 FIFA World Cup players